Minuscule 49 (in the Gregory-Aland numbering), ε 155 (von Soden), is a Greek minuscule manuscript of the New Testament, on parchment leaves. Paleographically it has been assigned to the 12th century. It has complex contents and full marginalia.

Description 

The codex contains the complete text of the four Gospels on 223 parchment leaves (size ). The text is written stichometrically in one column per page, 26-27 lines per page. After the biblical text followed "Historia tripartita" of Cassiodorus in  Lombards language.

There is also another division according to the smaller Ammonian Sections, with some references to the Eusebian Canons.

Text 

The Greek text of the codex is a representative of the Byzantine text-type. Hermann von Soden classified it to the textual family Kx. Kurt Aland placed it in Category V. 
According to the Claremont Profile Method it belongs to the textual family Family Kx in Luke 1 and Luke 10. In Luke 20 it represents family Πa.

History 

The manuscript was dated by Gregory to the 11th or 12th century. Currently it has been assigned by the INTF to the 12th century.

The manuscript was brought from Turkey about 1628 together with Codex Alexandrinus, by the English ambassador at the court of Sultan, Sir Thomas Roe. It was examined by John Mill (as Roe 1).

It was added to the list of the New Testament manuscripts by J. J. Wettstein.  C. R. Gregory saw it in 1883.

Since 1628 it has been housed at the Bodleian Library (MS. Roe 1), at Oxford.

See also 

 List of New Testament minuscules
 Biblical manuscript
 Textual criticism

References

Further reading 

 

Greek New Testament minuscules
12th-century biblical manuscripts
Bodleian Library collection